Eduard Hermann may refer to
Eduard Hermann (linguist) (1869–1950), German linguist
Eduard Hermann (racewalker) (1887–1960), Estonian Olympic racewalker
Eduard Hermann (wrestler) (1891–1947), Estonian wrestler